The Binghamton Devils were a professional ice hockey team in the American Hockey League (AHL) that played from 2017 to 2021 as the top minor league affiliate of the National Hockey League (NHL)'s New Jersey Devils. Based in Binghamton, New York, the Devils played their home games at Floyd L. Maines Veterans Memorial Arena. The team began play in Binghamton, NY during the 2017–18 season. For the 2020–21 season, the team temporarily relocated to the New Jersey Devils' practice rink for home games in Newark, New Jersey, during the COVID-19 pandemic. However, the team did not return to Binghamton, NY and the franchise was approved to relocate as the second incarnation of the AHL Utica Comets beginning with the 2021–22 season.

History
On September 26, 2016, shortly after it was announced that the Binghamton Senators were being purchased by their parent club and would relocate to Belleville, Ontario, for the 2017–18 season as the Belleville Senators, the Senators' management reaffirmed that they were working hard to keep AHL hockey in Binghamton for 2017–18 and beyond.

On January 25, 2017, the Times Union reported that the Albany Devils would move to Binghamton for 2017–18, citing the Devils' average per-game attendance of 2,888 being last in the AHL, although the Binghamton Senators' attendance had been second-to-last at 3,666. The official announcement of the team's relocation (and the Binghamton Devils name) was made on January 31, and noted that the organization had signed a five-year operating agreement. Over their first two seasons in Binghamton, the Devils' attendance increased to 3,896 and 3,471 per game.

Due to the effects of the COVID-19 pandemic, the New Jersey Devils chose to move their AHL affiliate to their practice rink for home games in Newark, New Jersey, for the 2020–21 season. In April 2021, it was reported there was an ongoing dispute between the local operators of the Binghamton Devils and the New Jersey Devils over moving the team to Newark for the season. On April 5, a trademark was filed for the brand "Utica Devils" by Robert Esche, the operator of the Utica Comets, with the Comets' franchise license owned by the Vancouver Canucks. According to the B-Devils vice president of operations Tom Mitchell, on April 14, 2021, he was informed by the New Jersey Devils that they planned to relocate the franchise for the 2021–22 season. On May 6, the AHL approved of the relocation to Utica, but retained the Comets branding already used by Esche with his current AHL club.

Season-by-season results

References

 
American Hockey League teams
New Jersey Devils minor league affiliates
Ice hockey teams in New York (state)
Ice hockey clubs established in 2017
Sports in Binghamton, New York
2017 establishments in New York (state)
2021 disestablishments in New York (state)
Ice hockey clubs disestablished in 2021